Öcsöd is a large village in Jász-Nagykun-Szolnok County, in the Northern Great Plain Region of south-east Hungary.

Geography
It covers an area of 54.47 km2 and has a population of 3319 people (2010).

External links

  in Hungarian

Populated places in Jász-Nagykun-Szolnok County